Valery Yuryevich Rudnev (born 16 February 1988, in Saint Petersburg) is a Russian tennis player.

Tennis career 
Rudnev has a career high ATP singles ranking of 210 achieved on 21 July 2014. He also has a career high ATP doubles ranking of 490 achieved on 22 March 2010. Rudnev has won a total of 7 ITF singles titles on the futures circuit as well as 1 ITF doubles title.

As a junior, Rudnev reached the boys' doubles final of the 2006 French Open with his partner Artur Chernov, where they lost to Emiliano Massa and Kei Nishikori 6-2, 1-6, 2-6.

Rudnev made his ATP main draw debut at the 2009 St. Petersburg Open where he received entry to the main draw as a wildcard entrant into the doubles event partnering Pavel Chekhov. The pair lost an all Russian first round encounter, losing to Igor Andreev and Mikhail Youzhny, 7–6(7–4), 4–6, [5–10].

ATP Challenger and ITF Futures finals

Singles: 14 (7–7)

Doubles: 6 (1–5)

Junior Grand Slam finals

Doubles: 1 (1 runner-up)

External links 

1988 births
Living people
Russian male tennis players
Sportspeople from Saint Petersburg
Tennis players from Moscow